The Aleko Hydro Power Plant is an active hydro power project near Aleko Konstantinovo, Bulgaria, which is part of the Batak Hydropower Cascade. It has 3 individual Francis turbines with an installed capacity of 66 MW of power.

External links

References

Hydroelectric power stations in Bulgaria
Buildings and structures in Pazardzhik Province